Lincoln's Inn Society was the only social club based at Harvard Law School, in Cambridge, Massachusetts. Its name echoed Lincoln's Inn in London, which is one of the four Inns of Court where English barristers are based. Originally, Lincoln's Inn was known as Choate Inn of the International Legal Fraternity of Phi Delta Phi but became a private club when the Harvard Faculty voted to ban all fraternities in 1907.  The Inn was a student-run refuge where students meet to relax after hard weeks of study. As a student-owned club, Lincoln's Inn is beyond university regulation. The Inn had a diverse and dynamic membership that was open to all members of the HLS community. Lincoln's Inn membership was once strictly male but it now admits women, and women have been President of the Society on numerous occasions. It has become especially popular with first-year students as a way to meet their classmates.

Lincoln's Inn Society merged with HL Central in 2007, following declining membership and a lack of funds.

History 

The Lincoln's Inn Society was founded in 1907 by three Harvard Law School students who hoped to found a social organization to provide some relief from the stress of law school.

Some of the most distinguished members of the legal profession count themselves among the society's over 3,200 alumni, including U.S. Supreme Court Justices Stephen Breyer, Anthony Kennedy and David Souter, several U.S. Senators and Representatives, and managing partners from the nation's most prestigious law firms.

Events 
The Inn is more than a gathering place. The Inn has a lively social calendar that includes some of the most exciting events at the Law School.

Winter Dinner: The flagship event of the Inn is the annual Winter Dinner, a black tie/formal event held at a downtown hotel. Members meet early in the evening at the Inn for the signing of the annual poster, a tradition as old as the Inn itself. Original posters from as far back as 1918 can be found adorning the walls of the house. Tickets are free for members and guest tickets are available for purchase.

Unfortunately, in 2007, due to a lack of funds, the winter dinner was not held, but members of the Society hope to reinstate it soon.

Harvard/Yale Game: Harvard may not be a university known for its athletics, but the annual Harvard/Yale game is a tradition that Inn members, and most of the community, can get excited about. The Inn provides a pre-game tailgate party and, when the game is held at Yale, a bus to transport members to New Haven to cheer on the Crimson.

Theme Parties: The Inn throws a number of festive themed events throughout the year. Some past highlights have included "Heaven and Hell," the Inn's annual Halloween party; the James Bond Martini Night; numerous Hawaiian-themed events; and the annual St. Patrick's Day party.

Spring Fling: In the mid 2000s, the Spring Fling offered students a chance to unwind a bit from their pre-exam stress by taking a scenic boat cruise of Boston Harbor. In some years, the Spring Fling has been a semi-formal dance as well.

A poster signed by all the current members is drawn every year to commemorate that year's Christmas/Winter Dinner.

Property 
The Inn itself is an historic three-story Victorian house located across the street from the Law School campus.  The house's amenities, before renovation, included three fireplaces, a pool table, a foosball table and a refurbished sports bar. All members receive keys and full access to the Inn during its operating hours. In 2007, the inn was renovated to change the second floor into offices and provide a more academic feel.

Lincoln's Inn is located at 44 Follen Street. The property is owned by the society.  The house is over 100 years old and has housed Lincoln's Inn for approximately 60 years.

Notable members 

Judiciary
Stephen Breyer '64 — Associate Justice of the Supreme Court
Anthony Kennedy '61 — Associate Justice of the Supreme Court
David Souter '66 — Associate Justice of the Supreme Court
Laurence Silberman '61 – Senior Judge, United States Court of Appeals for the District of Columbia Circuit

Politics
Joseph Califano '55 — Former U.S. Secretary of Health, Education and Welfare
Jim Cooper '80 — U.S. Congressman from Tennessee
Bob Graham '62 — Former U.S. Senator from Florida
Ken Mehlman '91 — Chairman of the Republican National Committee
Larry Pressler '71 — Former U.S. Senator from South Dakota
Ted Stevens '50 — U.S. Senator from Alaska
Clark T. Randt Jr. '74 — U.S. Ambassador to China
Jack Reed '82 — U.S. Senator from Rhode Island

Business
Victor F. Ganzi '71 — President and CEO of the Hearst Corporation
Laurance Rockefeller — Financier and philanthropist

Law Firm
Robert Joffe '67 — Former Presiding Partner of Cravath Swaine & Moore

Academia
Roger Fisher '48 — Professor at Harvard Law School, Author of "Getting to Yes"
John H. Langbein '68 — Professor at Yale Law School
Charles Nesson '63 — Professor at Harvard Law School

References

External links 
Lincoln's Inn blog (last update in 2007)

1907 establishments in Massachusetts
Harvard Law School
Organizations established in 1907